The Fighting Fitzgeralds is an American sitcom television series that aired on NBC from March 6 until May 15, 2001. It was created by filmmaker Edward Burns and his brother Brian.

Premise
"Fitz", a widower and former firefighter, wants to enjoy his retirement but shares his home with three grown sons, a daughter-in-law and a granddaughter.

Cast
Brian Dennehy as Mr. Fitzgerald
Justin Louis as Jim Fitzgerald
Connie Britton as Sophie Fitzgerald
Abigail Mavity as Marie Fitzgerald
Christopher Moynihan as Terry Fitzgerald
Jon Patrick Walker as Patrick Fitzgerald

Episodes

References

External links
 

 

2001 American television series debuts
2001 American television series endings
2000s American sitcoms
English-language television shows
NBC original programming
Television series by Universal Television
Television shows set in New York City